Statistics of League of Ireland in the 1960/1961 season.

Overview
It was contested by 12 teams, and Drumcondra won the championship and qualified to play in the 1961–62 European Cup for next season.

St Patrick's Athletic qualified to play in the 1961–62 European Cup Winners' Cup.

Final classification

Results

Top scorers

League of Ireland seasons
Ireland
1960–61 in Republic of Ireland association football